Frankliniella is a genus of thrips belonging to the family Thripidae.

The genus was first described by Karny in 1910.

The genus has cosmopolitan distribution. Frankliniella species can be quite variable in appearance, making identification challenging.

There are about 230 species in the genus. Species include:

 Frankliniella intonsa (Trybom, 1895)
 Frankliniella lantanae Mound, Nakahara & Day, 2005
 Frankliniella occidentalis (Pergande, 1895)
 Frankliniella schultzei (Trybom, 1910)
 Frankliniella tenuicornis
 Frankliniella tristis
 Frankliniella tritici
 Frankliniella williamsi Hood, 1915

References

Thripidae
Thrips genera